Natasha Denean Adair (née Barnes; born September 7, 1972) is the head women's college basketball coach for Arizona State. She replaced Charli Turner Thorne, who retired March 2022 after 25 seasons with the Sun Devils.

Playing career
Born Natasha Deanean Barnes in Silver Spring, Maryland, she attended Albert Einstein High School, where she was a track star, leading her team to the state championship and the Penn Relays Invitational, before switching to play basketball. She went on to be named as a USA All-American in high school basketball and began to receive interest from several college coaches, namely University of Connecticut's Geno Auriemma.

Following Adair's anterior cruciate ligament injury in 1990, Auriemma did not want her on his team. However,  University of South Florida Coach Trudi Lacey called with a plan for Adair to go to Pensacola, Florida, to receive treatment. After the treatment, she could play at Pensacola Junior College and, if recovery went well, transfer to South Florida. Adair went to Pensacola and played the following season, leading her team in rebounding and to two state championships. Lacey monitored her progression, and Adair transferred to South Florida. She graduated with a bachelor's degree in communication and still maintains the single season rebounding record.

Coaching career
Following Adair's playing career, she went on to be an assistant coach at Georgetown (1998–2004) and Wake Forest (2004–2012). At Georgetown, she was primarily responsible for the post players. At Wake Forest, she was recruiting coordinator and post coach, before being promoted to associate head coach in 2007.

In 2012, Adair became College of Charleston's women's head basketball coach. In her first season there, Adair guided her team to 16 wins and a spot in the Women's Basketball Invitational (WBI) postseason tournament. During the 2013-2014 season, Adair's team had a 19-15 record, marking the third-highest win total in the school's Division I era. The squad also finished third in conference play and advanced to the semifinals of both the Colonial Athletic Association Championship and the WBI. In 2014, Adair was introduced by Georgetown's Director of Athletics Lee Reed as the Hoyas' ninth women's head basketball coach.

Head Coaching record
Source:
 CAA 2017-18 Women's Basketball Standings

Personal life
Adair has two children.

References

1972 births
Living people
American women's basketball coaches
Georgetown Hoyas women's basketball coaches
Junior college women's basketball players in the United States
People from Silver Spring, Maryland
South Florida Bulls women's basketball players
Wake Forest Demon Deacons women's basketball coaches
College of Charleston Cougars women's basketball coaches
Basketball coaches from Maryland
Delaware Fightin' Blue Hens women's basketball coaches
Arizona State Sun Devils women's basketball coaches